Dinka or Kövidinka is a white Hungarian wine grape. There is also significant plantings near the Hungarian border in Slovenia, Croatia and Serbia.

Synonyms
Dinka is also known under the synonyms Bakar, Chtein Chiler, Crvena Dinka, Crvena Ruzica, Dinka Crvena, Dinka Mala, Dinka Rouge, Fleichstraube, Fleischtraube, Hajnalpiros, Kamena Dinka, Kamenoruziak Cerveny, Kamenoruzijak Cerveni, Kevidinka, Kövidinka, Kövidinka Rose, Kövidinka Rosovaia, Kövis Dinka, Kovidinka, Kovidinka Rose, Kovidinka Rozovaya, Kubinyi, Mala Dinka, Pankota, Pirca Voeroes, Piros Koevidinka, Raisin de Rose, Rosentraube, Roujitsa, Rusica, Ruzhitsa, Ruzica, Ruzica Crvena, Ruzike Cervena, Ruzsica, Ruzsitza, Schiller, Shtein Shiller, Sremska Ruzica, Steinschiller, Steinschiller Rother, Steinschiller Roz, Vörös Dinka, Vorosz Dinka, Werschätzer, and Werschatzer.

References

White wine grape varieties
Grape varieties of Hungary
Hungarian wine